Jan Loth (31 August 1900 – 7 June 1933) was a Polish footballer. He played in five matches for the Poland national football team between 1921 and 1924.

References

External links
 

1900 births
1933 deaths
Polish footballers
Poland international footballers
Footballers from Warsaw
Association football goalkeepers
Polish male tennis players
Association football forwards
Polonia Warsaw players